Franz Defregger (after 1883 Franz von Defregger) (30 April 1835 – 2 January 1921) was an Austrian artist known for producing genre art and history paintings set in his native county of Tyrol.

Biography 
Franz Defregger was born on 30 April 1835 at the Ederhof in Stronach, Tyrol in the Austrian Empire. He was the second son of Maria (née Fercher) and Michael Defregger, a farmer, who also had five daughters. His mother and two of his sisters died in 1841 during a typhoid epidemic. Franz himself nearly died from the fever. During his early years, Franz developed a strong love of music, and learned to play the flugelhorn. He soon became a member of a local band in Dölsach, playing at weddings, assemblies, and balls. Franz also displayed an early talent for drawing and woodcarving, which he developed autodidactically while working on his father's farm.

After his father died in 1858, Franz took over the farm at the age of twenty-three. Within two years, however, he sold the farm and shared the money with his sisters who wanted to emigrate to America. Defregger moved to Innsbruck and studied woodcarving with the sculptor Michael Stolz, a professor at the Innsbrucker Trade School. Stoltz soon recognized Defregger's greater talent as a painter, and in the autumn of 1860, he arranged a meeting with Karl von Piloty at the Academy of Fine Arts in Munich. At Piloty's suggestion, Defregger attended a preparatory class at the Academy with Hermann Dyck. On 19 July 1861, Defregger passed the entrance examination and was accepted into the Academy. In the autumn of that year, he enrolled in a painting class given by Hermann Anschutz.

In the summer of 1863, with the encouragement of architect Dominik Stadler, Defregger travelled to Paris to enhance his studies at the academy. He enrolled at the École des beaux-arts on the recommendation of Alexander Laemlein. In 1864, he took part in the Salon des Refusés; the Salon catalog from 1864 listed him as "élève de l'École des Beaux-Arts". During his time in Paris, Defregger's work was influenced by his experiences in the city and through autodidactic study at museums, art collections, and studios. After spending two years in Paris, Defregger returned to Munich in July 1865 and began studying under Piloty at the academy.

During the next few years, Defregger also spent time in East Tyrol, painting portraits of his relatives and friends. Between 1867 and 1870, he worked with Hans Makart and Gabriel of Max in the studio of the Munich history painter Piloty. His paintings were popular, and he soon became successful as an artist. He was professor of history painting from 1878 to 1910 at the Munich Art Academy. He preferred portraits, rustic motifs from the everyday life, and dramatic scenes from the Tyrolean national uprising of 1809.

In 1883, Defregger was given the Order of Merit of the Bavarian crown, and was made a Knight of the collected personal nobility. He received numerous prizes and awards, including the Prussian Order of Merit for Science and the Arts. In 1906, his work was displayed at the Century of German Art exhibition in Berlin. His students included the Gröden artists Josef Moroder Lusenberg and Hans Perathoner, Lovis Corinth, Walter Thor, Hugo Engl, Emma von Müller and many others. Defregger also worked alongside other artists in the studio, especially Rudolf Epp, developing a style consistent with the Munich school.

Franz Defregger died in Munich in 1921 at the age of 85. He was buried at Nordfriedhof in Munich.

Legacy 
Defregger's private home in Munich, called the Defregger House, was built by architect Georg von Hauberrisser. Defregger's residence in Bolzano, the Villa Defregger, was built in 1879 according to the plans of the Bolzano city architect Sebastian Altmann. In 1922 in Vienna, a street was named "Defreggerstraße" to honor the artist. Similar street dedications occurred in Bolzano and Gries am Brenner—both have since been renamed. Built in 1887, the Defreggerhaus refuge at the foot of the Großvenediger mountain was also named in his honor.

Gallery

References

Citations

Bibliography

External links 

1835 births
1921 deaths
People from Lienz District
People from the County of Tyrol
19th-century Austrian painters
19th-century Austrian male artists
Austrian male painters
20th-century Austrian painters
Austrian genre painters
19th-century painters of historical subjects
Burials at the Nordfriedhof (Munich)
Recipients of the Pour le Mérite (civil class)
20th-century Austrian male artists